Do You Wonder About Me? is the second studio album by American indie rock band Diet Cig. It was released on May 1, 2020 under Frenchkiss Records.

Critical reception
Do You Wonder About Me? was met with generally favorable reviews from critics. At Metacritic, which assigns a weighted average rating out of 100 to reviews from mainstream publications, this release received an average score of 70, based on 14 reviews.

Track listing

References

2020 albums
Frenchkiss Records albums